Spanish Grand Prix or Spain Grand Prix can refer to:

Spanish Grand Prix, a Formula One motor race
Individual races can be found via :Category:Spanish Grand Prix
Spanish motorcycle Grand Prix
Individual races can be found via :Category:Spanish motorcycle Grand Prix
K-1 Spain Grand Prix 2003 in Barcelona, a kickboxing event

See also 
 ISU Junior Grand Prix in Spain, a figure skating event